Young & Wild is a 2012 Chilean coming-of-age comedy-drama film directed by Marialy Rivas and co-written by Marialy Rivas, Camila Gutiérrez, María José Viera-Gallo and Pedro Peirano. Starring Alicia Rodríguez and Maria Gracia Omegna, the film tells the story of Daniela, a 17-year-old bisexual girl who writes a blog about the conflicts she experiences between her evangelical Protestant, conservative family and her sexuality. The film was released at the Sundance Film Festival in 2012 where it was awarded the World Cinema Screenwriting Award.

Plot
Daniela is a 17-year-old girl who resides in Santiago, Chile. Despite her family's devout Protestant beliefs, she eagerly explores her sexuality through both casual sex and a blog titled "Young and Wild." The blog serves as a platform where she questions her church's teachings and documents her sexual adventures, including her first experiences with masturbation, oral sex, and anal sex. As her blog gains popularity, it attracts comments from people ranging from supportive to gossipy, and even some who outright proposition her for sex.

Following an incident where she is caught having sex with another student, Daniela is expelled from her conservative Christian school. Her mother initially does not react to the news. Daniela later learns that her beloved aunt, a bohemian and a role model for her, has been hospitalized due to cancer. While at the hospital, Daniela's aunt pleads with her mother not to send Daniela to perform grueling missionary work. As a result, Daniela takes a job as a gofer at a local Christian television station, where she meets her coworkers Tomás and Antonia.

Daniela finds herself immediately drawn to Tomás and begins to fantasize about him. The two start dating, but Tomás refuses to engage in premarital sexual activity. Sexually frustrated, Daniela tries to seduce him and has some degree of success. After complaining to Antonia, she is invited to a party where she briefly performs oral sex on Tomás until he stops her. As she leaves the party, Daniela whispers to Antonia that she had intended to have sex with both Tomás and her. Soon after, Daniela and Antonia begin an affair that Daniela documents on her blog.

Daniela's parents come to trust Tomás, allowing him to spend unsupervised time with her. However, Tomás' reservations finally break down when Daniela questions his level of interest in her. The two eventually have sex, and Daniela writes on her blog about feeling torn between Antonia and Tomás, both of whom she is regularly sexually involved with. Antonia expresses displeasure with their clandestine relationship, but Daniela is unwilling to commit to only one partner. During a family dinner at a restaurant, thieves suddenly storm in, but the family's prayers cause the robbers to pass them by. This incident causes Daniela to begin questioning both her spirituality and morals.

Daniela stuns both her blog readers and family when she declares her desire to be baptized. Her family is overjoyed, and her aunt arranges a baptism at a lake, the same location where her aunt had been baptized. However, Tomás discovers Daniela's blog and learns about her infidelity. Furious, he ends their relationship, and her mother angrily rebukes Daniela for her behavior. Shortly after, her aunt passes away, leaving Daniela with many unanswered questions, ranging from spirituality to relationships. Daniela concludes the film with a voice-over quote from Paul the Apostle, stating that she now feels lost.

Cast

Critical reception
Critics had mixed reactions to the film.  The New York Times was unimpressed by Alicia Rodríguez' lead performance and the "insistently blanched" cinematography. On the other hand, other critics praised the portrayal of unwanted emotional conflicts emerging beyond physical relationships. Erik Childress of eFilmCritic writes: "This is a film that respects sex and the emotional consequences that follow once the heat wears off." Todd McCarthy for The Hollywood Reporter said about the film that "the ferocious effort of conservative religions to keep a tight lid on pre-marital sex is as old as history, but seeing it played out in a South American context gives it a new twist, at least onscreen."

Awards

|-
| 2012
| Alicia Rodríguez
| Colón de Plata award for Best Actress, Huelva Latin American Film Festival
| 
|-
| 2012
| Marialy Rivas
| Sebastiane Award, San Sebastián International Film Festival
| 
|-
| 2012
| Marialy Rivas
| Horizons Award, San Sebastián International Film Festival
| 
|-
| 2012
| Camila Gutiérrez, Marially Rivas, Pedro Peirano, Sebastián Sepúlveda
| World Cinema Screenwriting Award, Sundance Film Festival
| 
|-
| 2012
| Marialy Rivas
| Grand Jury Prize, World Cinema – Dramatic, Sundance Film Festival
| 
|}

See also
 List of LGBT-related films directed by women
 Cinema of Chile

References

External links
 
 
 

2012 films
2012 comedy-drama films
2012 independent films
2012 LGBT-related films
2010s Chilean films
2010s coming-of-age comedy-drama films
2010s erotic drama films
2010s sex comedy films
2010s Spanish-language films
2010s teen comedy-drama films
Chilean comedy-drama films
Chilean coming-of-age films
Chilean independent films
Chilean LGBT-related films
Female bisexuality in film
Lesbian-related films
LGBT-related comedy-drama films
LGBT-related coming-of-age films
LGBT-related sex comedy films
Teen LGBT-related films
Teen sex comedy films
Teensploitation
Films about the Internet
Films about LGBT and Christianity
Films about mother–daughter relationships
Films critical of Christianity and Christians
Films set in Chile
Films shot in Chile
Sundance Film Festival award winners